Pseudopanurgus fraterculus is a species of bee in the family Andrenidae. It is found in Central America and North America.

Subspecies
These two subspecies belong to the species Pseudopanurgus fraterculus:
 Pseudopanurgus fraterculus fraterculus
 Pseudopanurgus fraterculus timberlakei Cockerell, 1931

References

Further reading

 
 

Andrenidae
Articles created by Qbugbot
Insects described in 1802